Janakpatti is a village in Pindra tehsil, Varanasi district, Uttar Pradesh, India. The village has population of about 450 and is located close to the Varanasi–Jaunpur border.

References 

Villages in Varanasi district